Plata (also La Plata) is a barrio in the municipality of Aibonito, Puerto Rico. Its population in 2010 was 1,724.

History
Puerto Rico was ceded by Spain in the aftermath of the Spanish–American War under the terms of the Treaty of Paris of 1898 and became an unincorporated territory of the United States. In 1899, the United States Department of War conducted a census of Puerto Rico finding that the population of Plata barrio was 1,554.

Sectors
Barrios (which are like minor civil divisions) in turn are further subdivided into smaller local populated place areas/units called sectores (sectors in English). The types of sectores may vary, from normally sector to urbanización to reparto to barriada to residencial, among others.

The following sectors are in Plata barrio:

Special communities
Since 2001 when law 1-2001 was passed, measures have been taken to identify and address the high levels of poverty and the lack of resources and opportunities affecting specific communities in Puerto Rico. Initially there were 686 places that made the list. The places on the list are barrios, communities, sectors, or neighborhoods and in 2004, Amoldadero in La Plata, and Los Muros in La Plata made the list. In 2017, Jesus Velez Vargas, the director of the Special Communities of Puerto Rico program stated that the program was evolving with more ways to help the residents of these so-called marginal communities.

See also

 List of communities in Puerto Rico
 List of barrios and sectors of Aibonito, Puerto Rico

References

External links

Barrios of Aibonito, Puerto Rico